Giovanni Troupée (born 20 March 1998) is a Dutch professional footballer who plays as a right-back for Bulgarian First League club Lokomotiv Plovdiv.

Club career

Utrecht
Troupée is a youth exponent from FC Utrecht. He made his Eredivisie debut on 17 May 2015 as a 62nd-minute substitute for Jelle de Lange against Vitesse. He became a starter in the 2016–17 season under head coach Erik ten Hag, as Utrecht finished the season fourth in the league and later qualifying for the UEFA Europa League after winning play-offs. Troupée finished the season by winning the "David Di Tommaso Trophy" for best player of the year at Utrecht.

On 28 August 2018, he joined ADO Den Haag on a season-long loan, after losing his place in the starting lineup of Utrecht. He returned to Utrecht for the 2019–20 season, but was mainly a backup to Sean Klaiber in the right back position, which meant that he was sent on a six-month loan to FC Twente in January 2020. In a spring season, which was suspended due to the effects of COVID-19 pandemic, Troupée made 8 appearances for Twente.

Troupée started the 2020–21 season as a backup to Mark van der Maarel at the right back position for Utrecht.

Twente
As his contract with Utrecht expired in June 2021, Troupée left the club on a free transfer and signed a one-year contract with Twente. He left the club after one season as his contract expired.

Lokomotiv Plovdiv
On 20 December 2022, he signed with Bulgarian club Lokomotiv Plovdiv one a one-and-a-half-year deal. He made his debut for the club on 12 February 2013, starting in a 0–0 home draw against Botev Vratsa.

International career
Troupée is Netherlands-born to a Dutch father and Curaçaoan mother, and a former youth international for the Netherlands.

Honours
Jong Utrecht
 Beloften Eredivisie: 2015–16

Individual
 FC Utrecht Player of the Year: 2016–17

References

External links
 

Living people
1998 births
Association football fullbacks
Dutch footballers
Dutch expatriate footballers
Netherlands youth international footballers
Footballers from Amsterdam
Eredivisie players
FC Utrecht players
ADO Den Haag players
FC Twente players
PFC Lokomotiv Plovdiv players
Dutch people of Curaçao descent
Expatriate footballers in Bulgaria
Dutch expatriate sportspeople in Bulgaria